Never a Dull Moment may refer to:
 Never a Dull Moment (novel), a 1942 thriller novel by Peter Cheyney
Never a Dull Moment (1943 film), starring the Ritz Brothers
Never a Dull Moment (1950 film), starring Irene Dunne and Fred MacMurray
Never a Dull Moment (1968 film), starring Dick Van Dyke and Edward G. Robinson
Never a Dull Moment (Rod Stewart album), released 1972
Never a Dull Moment (Tommy Lee album), released 2002
Never a Dull Moment (EP) by Willie the Kid & Lee Bannon, released 2010